INS Dronacharya is the gunnery school of the Indian Navy. It is located in Kochi, Kerala. It is responsible for training 820 officers and 2100 ratings per year in small-arms, naval missiles, artillery, radar and defensive countermeasures.

See also
 Indian navy 
 List of Indian Navy bases
 List of active Indian Navy ships

 Integrated commands and units
 Armed Forces Special Operations Division
 Defence Cyber Agency
 Integrated Defence Staff
 Integrated Space Cell
 Indian Nuclear Command Authority
 Indian Armed Forces
 Special Forces of India

 Other lists
 Strategic Forces Command
 List of Indian Air Force stations
 List of Indian Navy bases
 India's overseas military bases

References

 

Indian Navy bases